DHAP in context of chemotherapy is an acronym for chemotherapy regimen that is used for remission induction in cases of relapsed or refractory non-Hodgkin lymphoma and Hodgkin's lymphoma. It is usually given for 2-3 courses, then followed by high-dose chemotherapy and autologous stem cell transplantation. In combination with anti-CD20 monoclonal antibody rituximab (Rituxan, Mabthera) it is called R-DHAP or DHAP-R.

[R]-DHAP regimen consists of:
 Rituximab, a monoclonal antibody, directed at B-cell surface antigen CD20
 (D)examethasone, a glucocorticoid hormone
 (H)igh-dose (A)ra-C - cytarabine, an antimetabolite;
 (P)latinol (cisplatin), a platinum-based antineoplastic, also an alkylating antineoplastic agent.

Dosing regimen

References

Chemotherapy regimens used in lymphoma